Love, Loss, and Auto-Tune is a studio album by Swamp Dogg. It was released via Joyful Noise Recordings on September 7, 2018. It peaked at number 7 on the Billboard Heatseekers Albums chart, as well as number 28 on the Independent Albums chart.

Production
The album was inspired by Kanye West's 808s & Heartbreak. After Swamp Dogg and MoogStar recorded a rough version of the album, Ryan Olson and Justin Vernon spent several years "refining, fine-tuning, and deconstructing" these recordings. The album includes the cover versions of "Answer Me, My Love" and "Star Dust". In a 2018 interview with Los Angeles Times, Swamp Dogg said, "It's the best thing I've done since the '70s."

Music videos
Music videos were created for "I'll Pretend", "Lonely", "Sex with Your Ex", and "Star Dust".

Critical reception

At Metacritic, which assigns a weighted average score out of 100 to reviews from mainstream critics, the album received an average score of 74, based on 8 reviews, indicating "generally favorable reviews".

Mark Deming of AllMusic wrote, "with Love, Loss, and Auto-Tune, Swamp Dogg takes a very deep dive into the electronic side of contemporary pop, hip-hop, and R&B, and he predictably pushes it to the wall." Elias Leight of Rolling Stone wrote, "On Love, Loss, and Auto-Tunes best songs, [Ryan] Olson's synth-heavy backdrops evoke the late Eighties, landing somewhere between early Chicago house music and twitchy hip-hop." Jon Pareles of The New York Times commented that "Swamp Dogg sets off into a bizarre, unsettled realm of computer-manipulated vocals and surreal, anything-can-happen electronic backdrops." Stephen M. Deusner of Pitchfork wrote, "The experiment succeeds because Swamp Dogg delivers on all three aspects of his album title: the ecstasies of love, the misery of loss, and the way Auto-Tune can be used to magnify those feelings."

Mojo placed it at number 56 on the "Top 75 Albums of 2018" list.

Track listing

Personnel
Credits adapted from liner notes.

 Swamp Dogg – vocals, keyboards (1)
 MoogStar – production, vocals (1)
 Andrew Broder – production (1, 5, 7)
 Justin Vernon – messina (1–8), vocals (3), keyboards (4)
 Romain Bly – French horn (1, 7), arrangement (1, 7, 9)
 Alistair Sung – cello (1, 7, 9)
 Thora Margret Sveinsdottir – viola (1, 7, 9)
 Shelley Soerensen – violin (1, 7)
 Marlies van Gangelen – oboe (1, 7)
 Maaike van der Linde – flute (1, 7)
 Taskforce – production (1, 8)
 Amire Johnson – keyboards (1)
 Brian Nichols – keyboards (2, 5, 6)
 Erik Andersen – keyboards (2, 5)
 Lazerbeak – boom bap (2, 5)
 Jake Hanson – guitar (2, 6)
 Charles Hayes – saxophone (2, 8)
 Chris Bierden – bass guitar (2, 9)
 Ryan Olson – keyboard bass (3), bass guitar (6), piano (9)
 Bobby Raps – snare (3), handclap (7)
 Guitar Shorty – guitar (3), headphone bleed (3)
 Seth Rosetter – deep noise (3)
 Psymun – production (4, 5)
 Sen 09 – production (4)
 Elliot Kozel – keyboards (4)
 Morgan Whirledge – keyboards (4)
 Isaac Gale – bass guitar (4)
 V*agra – shaker (4)
 Chris Eagan – drums (5)
 Josh Berg – beat (6)
 Trever Hagen – production (7)
 Jeremy Ylvisaker – guitar (7)
 Decarlo Jackson – bass guitar (7)
 Mark McGee – shaker (7)
 Drew Christopherson – hi-hat (9)
 Andre de Ridder – violin (9)
 Mayah Kadish – violin (9)
 David McMurry – photography
 Erik Madigan Heck – photography
 David J. Woodruff – layout

Chart history

References

External links
 Love, Loss, and Auto-Tune at Bandcamp
 

2018 albums
Swamp Dogg albums
Joyful Noise Recordings albums